Francisco Gironella (born 30 September 1930) is a Spanish rower. He competed in the men's coxed four event at the 1952 Summer Olympics.

References

External links
 

1930 births
Possibly living people
Spanish male rowers
Olympic rowers of Spain
Rowers at the 1952 Summer Olympics
Place of birth missing (living people)